Edona Kastrati (born 12 August 1999) is an Kosovan footballer who plays as a defender for Italian Serie C club Vicenza and the Kosovo women's national team.

See also
List of Kosovo women's international footballers

References

External links

1999 births
Living people
Women's association football defenders
Kosovan women's footballers
Kosovo women's international footballers
Italian women's footballers
Italian people of Kosovan descent